Lemonal may refer to:
 Lemonal, Belize, a village in Belize District, Belize
 Citral, a chemical with the molecular formula C10H16O